CSAS may refer to:

 Canadian Special Air Service Company, an elite post-war parachute unit.
 Center for the Study of the American South
 Central Sleep Apnea Syndrome
 Combined Statistical Area, a statistical unit used by the United States Census and other offices.
 Coal Smoke Abatement Society, a predecessor to Environmental Protection UK.
 Community Safety Accreditation Scheme
 Chattanooga School for the Arts & Sciences
 Czechoslovak Academy of Sciences
 Command Stability Augmentation System, a fly-by-wire feature of the Panavia Tornado.